The Ehrensköld class was the first "modern" class of destroyer built by the Swedish Navy after the First World War. It introduced several new features, mainly heavy armament in three 12 cm guns and the new 53 cm torpedo. They patrolled the Baltic Sea until 1963, after which they became target vessels. Nordenskjöld was scrapped in 1964 and Ehrensköld in 1974.

Construction and design
In the early 1920s, the Royal Swedish Navy operated 10 destroyers and 29 first-class torpedo boats. The destroyers, which dated between 1902 and 1917, were of similar design, displacing  and armed with  guns and  torpedo tubes. These ships were smaller and less heavily armed than other navies' destroyers, particularly when compared to those of the British Royal Navy and the Soviet Navy.

The main gun armament was three  guns built by Bofors in single mounts on the ships' centreline, with one gun forward, one aft and one between the ships' two funnels, from which it had a restricted arc of fire. Anti-aircraft armament consisted of two Vickers 40 mm automatic anti-aircraft guns. Torpedo armament consisted of two triple mounts for  torpedoes, while the ships were also fitted for minelaying, being able to carry 20 mines.

The two ships were launched in 1926 and commissioned in 1927.

Operational history
The two destroyers patrolled in the Baltic Sea to defend Sweden's neutrality during the Second World War, when the ships' 40 mm Vickers anti-aircraft guns were replaced by four Bofors 25 mm cannons in two twin mountings.

In 1950–51, the two destroyers were repurposed as anti-submarine frigates. The aft two  guns and the torpedo tubes were removed to allow the fitting of an improved anti-aircraft and anti-submarine armament and sensors. As rebuilt, armament was one 120 mm gun, four 40 mm Bofors guns and a single 20 mm cannon.

They remained in use until 1963, after which they were used as target vessels. Nordenskjöld was scrapped in 1964 and Ehrensköld in 1974.

Ships in the class

Notes and references

Notes

Citations

References